The Ernest Edward Greene House is a historic residence in Cullman, Alabama.  The house was built in 1913 by Ernest Edward Greene, the superintendent of Southern Cotton Oil Company.  After Greene's death in 1922, the house was passed on to several more owners, including John George Luyben, Sr., who lived in the house for 34 years.

The two-story house is built in Neoclassical style, and has a side gable roof with two interior chimneys.  The three-bay façade features a double-height portico, supported by two Ionic columns.  The corners of the house have matching Ionic capitaled pilasters.  A one-story, hip roofed porch supported by ten Tuscan columns wraps around the front of the house and halfway down each side.  The front door has one large pane of glass, as well as a transom and sidelights; a similar door leads from the second floor hall to the deck above.  The door and portico are flanked on the first floor by 40-over-1 sash windows on the ground floor, while the second floor features 35-over-1 sashes; the side elevations have 25-over-1 sashes, with 20-over-1 and 10-over-1 windows on the rear.  There are rounded 25-over-1 windows in the attic-level gable ends.  The interior is laid out in a center-hall plan, with two rooms on either side of a main hall.  A dining room, living room, kitchen, and study are on the main floor, with three bedrooms and a sitting room on the second.

The house was listed on the Alabama Register of Landmarks and Heritage in 1986 and the National Register of Historic Places in 1993.

References

National Register of Historic Places in Cullman County, Alabama
Houses on the National Register of Historic Places in Alabama
Neoclassical architecture in Alabama
Houses completed in 1913
Houses in Cullman County, Alabama
Properties on the Alabama Register of Landmarks and Heritage
1913 establishments in Alabama